Charles Andrews (May 27, 1827 New York Mills, Oneida County, New York – October 22, 1918 Syracuse, Onondaga County, New York) was an American lawyer and politician. He was Chief Judge of the New York Court of Appeals from 1881 to 1882 and from 1892 to 1897.

Life
He was the son of George Andrews and Polly Andrews. He was educated at Cazenovia Seminary and then studied law at Syracuse, N.Y. He was admitted to the bar in 1849. On May 17, 1855, he married Marcia A. Shankland (1832–1921), and their son was William Shankland Andrews.

Charles Andrews was District Attorney of Onondaga County from 1854 to 1856. He was Mayor of Syracuse, New York from 1861 to 1862, and in 1868. He was a delegate to the New York State Constitutional Convention of 1867, and to the 1868 Republican National Convention.

In May 1870, he was elected one of the first judges of the re-organized New York Court of Appeals. He was appointed Chief Judge by Governor Alonzo B. Cornell after the resignation of Charles J. Folger in 1881, and remained on the post until the end of 1882. At the State election in November 1882, Andrews ran to succeed himself for a full 14-year term as Chief Judge but was defeated by Democrat William C. Ruger. Andrews resumed his post as an associate judge and was re-elected unopposed to another 14-year term in November 1884. In November 1892, he was elected unopposed Chief Judge. He retired at the end of 1897 when he reached the constitutional age limit of 70 years, after 27 and a half years on the Court of Appeals bench, the longest tenure ever.

He was buried at Oakwood Cemetery (Syracuse, New York).

Sources
 Political Graveyard
 Obit in NYT on October 23, 1918 (giving erroneously "Whitehouse" as birthplace, the Village of New York Mills lies in the Town of Whitestown, New York)
The New York Civil List compiled by Franklin Benjamin Hough (page 378; Weed, Parsons and Co., 1858)
 Nominated by Republicans and Democrats, in NYT on October 13, 1892 (giving erroneously middle initial "F.")
 Listing of Court of Appeals judges, with portrait

External links

1827 births
1918 deaths
Cazenovia College alumni
People from New York Mills, New York
Chief Judges of the New York Court of Appeals
Mayors of Syracuse, New York
Onondaga County District Attorneys
Burials at Oakwood Cemetery (Syracuse, New York)
New York (state) Republicans
19th-century American judges